The 2014 NASCAR K&N Pro Series West was the 61st season of the K&N Pro Series West. It began with the Talking Stick Resort 75 at Phoenix International Raceway on February 27, and will end with the Casino Arizona 100, also at Phoenix, on November 6. Derek Thorn entered the season as the defending Drivers' Champion. 2011 champion Greg Pursley won his second championship after the last race, 17 points ahead of Dylan Lupton.

This season was also notable for featuring the debut of James Bickford, the cousin of NASCAR legend Jeff Gordon. Driving the No. 6 car for Sunrise Ford Racing, Bickford went on to win rookie of the year for the season.

Drivers

Notes

Schedule

Notes

Results and standings

Races

Drivers' championship

(key) Bold - Pole position awarded by time. Italics - Pole position set by final practice results or rainout. * – Most laps led.

Notes
1 – Scored points towards the K&N Pro Series East.
2 – Zack Huffman, Austin Cameron and Braeden Havens received championship points, despite the fact that they did not qualify for the race.

See also

2014 NASCAR Sprint Cup Series
2014 NASCAR Nationwide Series
2014 NASCAR Camping World Truck Series
2014 NASCAR K&N Pro Series East
2014 NASCAR Whelen Modified Tour
2014 NASCAR Whelen Southern Modified Tour
2014 NASCAR Canadian Tire Series
2014 NASCAR Toyota Series
2014 NASCAR Whelen Euro Series

References

ARCA Menards Series West